Joydeep Bhattacharjee (born 28 December 1995) is an Indian cricketer. He made his List A debut for Tripura in the 2015–16 Vijay Hazare Trophy on 13 December 2015. He made his Twenty20 debut for Tripura in the 2016–17 Inter State Twenty-20 Tournament on 31 January 2017. He made his first-class debut for Tripura in the 2017–18 Ranji Trophy on 14 October 2017.

References

External links
 

1995 births
Living people
Indian cricketers
Tripura cricketers
Cricketers from Tripura